Corymbia paractia, commonly known as the Cable Beach ghost gum, is a species of low-growing tree that is endemic to the Kimberley region of Western Australia. It has smooth white to pale grey bark, sometimes with rough bark near the base of the trunk, lance-shaped adult leaves, flower buds in groups of three or seven, creamy white flowers and cup-shaped, barrel-shaped or cylindrical fruit.

Description
It has smooth creamy white to pale grey bark that is shed in thin scales, sometimes with thin, rough, flaky brownish bark near the base of the trunk. The crown  of the tree has both intermediate and adult leaves. The tree usually loses its leaves in the dry season. Flowering occurs between April and May or October and December and the flowers are creamy white.

Taxonomy and naming
Corymbia paractia was first formally in 1995 by Ken Hill and Lawrie Johnson. The specific epithet (paractia) is from the Greek  meaning "on the seaside", referring to the habitat of this species.

Distribution and habitat
Cable Beach ghost gum is confined to a small area on the Kimberley coast, near Broome, where it grows in skeletal soils in the area between the coastal beach sand dunes and the red pindan soils.

Conservation status
This eucalypt is classified as "Priority One" by the Government of Western Australia Department of Parks and Wildlife, meaning that it is known from only one or a few locations which are potentially at risk.

See also
 List of Corymbia species

References

paractia
Myrtales of Australia
Rosids of Western Australia
Plants described in 1995